Lubomir "Lui" Temelkovski (born October 4, 1954) is a former Canadian federal politician. He was a Liberal Member of Parliament from 2004 to 2008 who represented the riding of Oak Ridges—Markham in Ontario.

Background
Temelkovski was born Brajčino, Yugoslavia which is now part of the Republic of North Macedonia. His family emigrated to Canada in 1968. He received his Bachelor of Arts degree from McMaster University. He worked as a sales manager for Freedom 55 Financial, a Canadian financial services company. He and his wife Loretta live in Markham where they raised four children. He is fluent in Italian and Macedonian.

Politics
In the 2004 Canadian federal election, Temelkovski ran as the Liberal candidate in the new riding of Oak Ridges—Markham. He defeated Conservative candidate Bob Callow by 11,252 votes. He served as a backbench supporter of the Paul Martin government. Temelkovski was the first Canadian Member of Parliament of Macedonian heritage. In 2004, he was appointed to serve on the Standing Committee on Citizenship and Immigration. He also served as the Vice-Chair of the Standing Committee on International Trade.

He was re-elected in the 2006 election once again defeating Callow. The Liberals lost the election and he served one term in opposition. During that time he served as critic for Public Works and Government Services.

In the 2008 election, he was defeated by Conservative candidate Paul Calandra by 545 votes. He tried again In the 2011 election and was defeated again by Calandra this time by more than 20,000 votes.

In 2013, Temelkovski expressed interest in the nomination for the new riding of Markham—Stouffville but the party chose Jane Philpott who went on to beat Calandra in the 2015 election.

References

External links

 Candidate information for Lui Temelkovski at the Liberal Party of Canada

1954 births
Canadian people of Macedonian descent
Eastern Orthodox Christians from Canada
Living people
Liberal Party of Canada MPs
McMaster University alumni
Members of the Macedonian Orthodox Church
Members of the House of Commons of Canada from Ontario
People from Resen Municipality
Yugoslav emigrants to Canada
21st-century Canadian politicians